is a railway station in  Hamakita-ku, Hamamatsu,  Shizuoka Prefecture, Japan, operated by the private railway company, Enshū Railway.

Lines
Enshū-Gansuiji Station is a station on the  Enshū Railway Line and is 16.3 kilometers from the starting point of the line at Shin-Hamamatsu Station.

Station layout
The station has a single unnumbered island platform, connected to a small, rustic wooden station building. The station building has automated ticket machines, and automated turnstiles which accept the NicePass smart card, as well as ET Card, a magnetic card ticketing system. The station is unattended.

Platforms

Adjacent stations

|-
!colspan=5|Enshū Railway

Station History
It was given its present name in April 1923. The station has been unattended since 1974.

Passenger statistics
In fiscal 2017, the station was used by an average of 429 passengers daily (boarding passengers only).

Surrounding area
Gansu-ji
Shizuoka Prefectural Forest Park

See also
 List of railway stations in Japan

References

External links

 Enshū Railway official website

Railway stations in Japan opened in 1909
Railway stations in Shizuoka Prefecture
Railway stations in Hamamatsu
Stations of Enshū Railway